The Sky was a magazine for amateur astronomers published between 1935 and 1941. It was the successor to a monthly bulletin called The Amateur Astronomer, which was published by the Amateur Astronomers Association (AAA) of New York City, and a precursor to Sky & Telescope before merging with The Telescope.

See also
Amateur astronomy

References

Amateur astronomy
Science and technology magazines published in the United States
Monthly magazines published in the United States
Astronomy magazines
Magazines established in 1935
Magazines disestablished in 1941
Defunct magazines published in the United States
1935 establishments in the United States
1941 disestablishments in the United States